Billy Engle (May 28, 1889 – November 28, 1966) was an Austro-Hungarian Empire-born American film actor. He appeared in more than 250 films between 1917 and 1957. He was born in the Austro-Hungarian Empire and died in Hollywood, California, from a heart attack.

Engle's stage debut occurred when he portrayed a cartoonist in Now and Then at Miner's Theater in New York City. He was a featured player with the Christie comedies.

Partial filmography

 Special Delivery (1922)
 The Soilers (1923)
 Scorching Sands (1923)
 Postage Due (1924)
 Zeb vs. Paprika (1924)
 Near Dublin (1924)
 Rupert of Hee Haw (1924)
 Wide Open Spaces (1924)
 What Happened to Jones (1926)
 Cruise of the Jasper B (1926)
 Red Hot Leather (1926)
 The Western Whirlwind (1927)
 Ridin' for Justice (1932)
 Exposed (1932)
 It Happened One Night (1934)
 The Gold Ghost (1934)
 It's a Gift (1934)
 Uncivil Warriors (1935)
 Mrs. Miniver (1942)
 The Best Years of Our Lives (1946)

References

External links

1889 births
1966 deaths
American male film actors
American male silent film actors
Austro-Hungarian emigrants to the United States
Male actors from Hollywood, Los Angeles
20th-century American male actors
Place of birth missing